Matthew Steenvoorden (born 9 January 1993) is a Dutch professional footballer who plays as a centre-back for Croatian First Football League club Gorica. He formerly played for Feyenoord, Excelsior and FC Dordrecht. Besides the Netherlands, he has played in Croatia.

International career
Steenvorden is of Indonesian descent.

References

External links
 
 Matthew Steenvoorden at Soccerway

1993 births
Living people
People from Leidschendam
Association football central defenders
Indonesian footballers
Dutch people of Indonesian descent
Feyenoord players
Excelsior Rotterdam players
FC Dordrecht players
SC Cambuur players
HNK Gorica players
Eerste Divisie players
Eredivisie players
Croatian Football League players
Expatriate footballers in Croatia
Footballers from South Holland